Bay County is the name of three counties:

 Bay County, Florida, United States
 Bay County, Michigan, United States
 Baicheng County, also known as Bay County (pronounced like 'bye'), Aksu Prefecture, Xinjiang, China